Ashwamedha is a 1990 Indian Kannada language action film directed by C. R. Simha. It stars Kumar Bangarappa and Geethanjali with Srividya, Srinath, Balakrishna, Avinash and Ramesh Bhat essaying other important roles.

The story was written by C. R. Simha who co-wrote the screenplay and dialogues with Keerthi. The film was produced by Shanthilal Jain in the banner of Sri Renukamba Enterprises. The film was edited by S. Manohar while R. Deviprasad handled the cinematography.

The film met with positive reviews upon release and is often regarded as one of the best films in Kumar Bangarappa's career.

Cast

 Kumar Bangarappa
 Geethanjali
 Srinath
 Srividya
 Balakrishna
 Keerthi
 Ramesh Bhat
 Avinash
 Disco Shanti
 Michael Madhu

Soundtrack

Sangeetha Raja composed the background score for the film and to the soundtracks, with the lyrics for all the soundtracks penned by Doddarange Gowda. The album consists of five soundtracks. The soundtrack "Hrudaya Samudra Kalaki" sung by actor and playback singer, Rajkumar, was received very well and is often considered one of his best songs. The song is still being played in cultural and religious activities, and concerts across Karnataka.

References

External links 
 Ashwamedha at gaana

1990 films
1990s Kannada-language films
Films scored by S. P. Venkatesh